Destiny Herndon-De La Rosa (born August 10, 1983) is an American anti-abortion activist. She is the founder of the anti-abortion organization New Wave Feminists. She is also a frequent op-ed contributor for The Dallas Morning News.

Personal life
Destiny Herndon-De La Rosa was born on August 10, 1983, to a nineteen-year-old sophomore at the University of Texas at Austin. She never knew her biological father. At age 16, she became pregnant and rejected abortion in favor of raising the child herself. Now married, she has four children, two boys and two girls. Although she formerly worked in architecture, she now runs her anti-abortion feminist group, New Wave Feminists, full time with the help of her vice-president and close friend, Cessilye Smith.

In 2017 it was reported that Herndon De La Rosa switched her party affiliation from Republican to Independent, having previously been involved with local GOP organizations such as the Golden Corridor Republican Women. She continues to work closely with conservative organizations and Republican operatives.

In a public Facebook posting in November 2021, while discussing a scandal involving the infidelity and financial impropriety of Texas anti-abortion figures Kari Beckman and  Jim Graham, Herndon De La Rosa admitted to being unfaithful in her own marriage at some point in the past, going on to say she generally does not speak about it publicly out of "respect for her husband". She indicated that they have moved on from her affair, and expressed that she is "incredibly fortunate" that her marriage survived.

New Wave Feminists
Herndon-De La Rosa co-founded anti-abortion group New Wave Feminists in 2004. The group promotes the consistent life ethic, opposing the death penalty, torture, and unjust war. The group is a member of the Consistent Life Network, a non-sectarian and non-partisan international network of organisations embodying this philosophy.

While Herndon-De La Rosa and the New Wave Feminists are known primarily for opposition to abortion, she has also written on related anti-abortion subjects, such as an editorial published in The Dallas Morning News expressing opposition to calls for execution of Nikolas Cruz, the so-called "Parkland shooter", and to the death penalty in general.

In 2018, Herndon-De La Rosa expelled co-founder Kristen Walker Hatten from her position as vice president of New Wave Feminists after it was leaked that she was allegedly a white nationalist in the wake of the election of Donald Trump. She has also been vocal in criticizing the association between some anti-abortion campaigners and the presidency of Donald Trump, as well as some campaigning tactics of the mainstream anti-abortion movement.

In 2018, Herndon-De La Rosa traveled to Ireland to campaign against the repeal of the 8th Amendment, who gave a constitutional legal protection of the unborn and prohibition on abortion. The effort was ultimately futile as the Irish voters overwhelmingly to repeal it.

In July 2019, New Wave Feminists partook in a campaign of over fifty anti-abortion groups who took more than $133,000 in supplies and $72,000 in funds to immigrant respite centres on the Texas-Mexico border. Supplies focused on the needs of immigrant mothers and babies.

In October 2019 Herndon-De La Rosa released a statement on social media announcing her personal and organizational intention to sever ties with Abby Johnson's "And Then There Were None" abortion opposition group. Her stated reason was Abby's "blatantly racist statements" in a Twitter feud Johnson had with an African American minister. This resulted in some division among her friends and followers on various forums, which in turn led to an extended personal sabbatical from social media.

Women's March
On January 13, 2017, 2017 Women's March event organizers granted the pro-life feminist group New Wave Feminists partnership status. But after the organization's involvement was publicized in The Atlantic, it was removed from the partners page on the march's website. Other anti-abortion groups that had been granted partnership status, including Abby Johnson's And Then There Were None (ATTWN) and Stanton Healthcare, were subsequently unlisted as partners as well. However, New Wave Feminists still took part in the official march. Herndon-De La Roasa told St. Louis Review that she felt welcome at the event.

Herndon-De La Rosa also attended the 2018 Women's March.

Regarding the 2021 Women's March, Herndon De La Rosa posted on Facebook "It’s 100% an abortion rally, so obviously we can’t participate in the traditional way for this one." Despite her declaration, the previous Women's Marches she participated in had also expressly been in support of abortion rights.

References

1983 births
Living people
The Dallas Morning News people
American consistent life ethics activists
21st-century American women